The Midyat Limestone is located in the Midyat Group dominates the surface geology of the anticlinal structures of the Mardin High of southeastern Turkey. This Eocene aged light yellowish marly chalk was formed in a marine depositional environment near the continental shelf.  Fossils such as echinoids and nummulites can be seen in the different sections of this limestone formation which can have a thickness between 300 and 400 meters.

In the few areas that have exposed Cretaceous rocks, there is a transitional layer known as the Gercus, which separates the younger Eocene limestone.  This transitional layer consists of  red sandy gypsum bearing beds interbedded with marl and limestone. 
Exposed areas of the older Cretaceous Germav Formation can be seen in small areas of the Mardin High.  The exposed Germav consists of shale, but has and a slow transition into more marls and limestones toward the bottom of the formation toward the Lower Cretaceous Mardin Limestone.

References

Cenozoic geologic formations
Geology of Turkey
Geologic formations of Asia